Frida Scheps Weinstein (born October 1936) is a French author. Her book A Hidden Childhood: A Jewish Girl's Sanctuary in a French Convent was a finalist for the Pulitzer Prize for Biography or Autobiography.

Biography
Scheps Weinstein was born in 1936 to immigrant Jewish-Russian parents in Paris, but was teased for looking German. By the age of six, she was sent away to live in the care of the Red Cross at the Château de Beaujeu, a convent school. As she grew up safe from The Holocaust, Scheps Weinstein began to forget her Jewish background and asked to become baptized as a Catholic, despite her mother's wishes. Upon the conclusion of the war, she reconciled with her father in Jerusalem, where she received her education and enlisted in the Israel Defense Forces.

Once Scheps Weinstein completed her army service in 1960, she moved to the United States and worked for Agence France-Presse. While in America, she published a memoir of her memories from The Holocaust in a book titled A Hidden Childhood: A Jewish Girl's Sanctuary in a French Convent, which was a finalist for the Pulitzer Prize for Biography or Autobiography.

References

1936 births
Living people
American people of French-Jewish descent
French emigrants to the United States
American women non-fiction writers
French women writers
French women non-fiction writers
Israeli soldiers
21st-century American women